The Golden Sheaf Award for the best Short Subject is presented by the Yorkton Film Festival.

History
In 1947 the Yorkton Film Council was founded.  In 1950 the first Yorkton Film Festival was held in Yorkton, Saskatchewan, Canada.  During the first few festivals, the films were adjudicated by audience participation through ballot casting and winners were awarded Certificates of Merit by the film festival council.  In 1958 the film council established the Yorkton Film Festival Golden Sheaf Award for the category Best of Festival, awarded to the best overall film of the festival.  Over the years various additional categories were added to the competition.  As of 2020, the Golden Sheaf Award categories included: Main Entry Categories, Accompanying Categories, Craft Categories, and Special Awards.

In 1998 the Golden Sheaf Award for best Documentary Short Subject was added to the Main Entry Categories of the film festival competition. The name was shortened to best Short Subject in 2012. The winner of this award is determined by a panel of jurors chosen by the film council.  Fiction and non-fiction films are considered in this category which are productions 15 minutes or less in length on any subject and in any genre.

Winners

1990s

2000s

2010s

2020s

References 

Awards established in 1998
Yorkton Film Festival awards
Canadian documentary film awards